Columnidin is an orange red pigment, belonging to the 3-deoxyanthocyanidins found in red-flowered western-hemisphere gesneriad species such as episcias, columneas, sarmientas, and sinningias. 

The columnidin is named after the gesneriad genus Columnea in which it is found, notably in Columnea hybrida.

References

Anthocyanidins
Catechols
Hydroxyquinols